Zoological conspiracy theories involving Israel are occasionally found in the media or on the Internet, typically in Muslim-majority countries, alleging use of animals by Israel to attack civilians or to conduct espionage. These conspiracies are often reported as evidence of a Zionist or Israeli plot.

Examples include the December 2010 shark attacks in Egypt, Hezbollah claims of capturing Israeli spying eagles, and the 2011 capture in Saudi Arabia of a griffon vulture carrying an Israeli-labeled satellite tracking device.

Birds 

Birds (as well as other animals) are often tagged with GPS tracking devices or identification bands to record their movements for animal migration tracking and similar reasons. The high-resolution tracks available from a GPS-enabled system can potentially allow for tighter control of animal-borne communicable diseases such as the H5N1 strain of avian influenza.

According to Ohad Hatzofe, an avian ecologist for the Israel's Nature and Parks Authority, the idea that tagged birds are used for spying is absurd. "Birds and other wildlife belongs to all of us and we have to cooperate," he stated. "Ignorance causes these stupid beliefs that they are used for spying."

Kestrel 

The kestrel is frequent visitor to Israel and Turkey during the nesting season.
In 2013, a kestrel carrying an Israeli foot band was discovered by villagers in the Elazığ Province, Turkey. Initially, medical personnel at Firat University identified the bird as "Israeli Spy" in their registration documents, however after thorough medical examinations, including X-ray scans, the bird was determined to be carrying no electronic equipment. No charges were filed and the kestrel was freed and allowed to continue its flight.

Bee-eater 

In May 2012, a dead European bee-eater with an Israeli leg-band, used by naturalists to track migratory birds, was found by villagers near the southeastern Turkish city of Gaziantep. The villagers worried that the bird may have carried a micro-chip from Israeli intelligence to spy on the area and alerted local officials. The head of the Agriculture and Livestock Provincial Directorate in Gaziantep, Akif Aslanpay, examined the corpse of the bee-eater and stated that he found that "the nose of the bird is very different and much lighter than others" and that it "can be used for audio and video," which, "in the case of Israel, they do." A counter-terrorism unit became involved before Turkey's agriculture ministry assured villagers that it is common to equip migratory birds with rings in order to track their movements.

The BBC correspondent, Jonathan Head, ascribed the event to his view that "wildly implausible conspiracy theories take root easily in Turkey, with alleged Israeli plots among the most widely believed."

Vultures 
In December 2012, a Sudanese newspaper reported that the Sudan government had captured a vulture in the town of Kereinek, which they said was an Israeli spy bird and was tagged in Hebrew and equipped with electronic devices.

Ohad Hazofe, the avian ecologist, told Israeli news site Ynet: "This is a young vulture that was tagged, along with 100 others, in October. He has two wing bands and a German-made GPS chip." Hazofe denied that the device had any photographic capabilities. In an interview with CNN, he stated that "I'm not an intelligence expert, but what would be learned from putting a camera onto a vulture? You cannot control it. It's not a drone that you can send where you want. What would be the benefit of watching a vulture eat the insides of a dead camel?"

Eagles 

In 2013, Hezbollah claimed that an Israeli spying eagle had been captured in Lebanon. They claimed that the eagle was one of many birds sent by Israel to spy and gather information via GPS transmitters across the Middle East. Tel Aviv University responded: "[T]his morning, the media reported on an Israeli 'spy" that was caught by Hezbollah. The 'spy' is a predatory fowl that was part of a research project conducted by Tel Aviv University on raptors".

The eagle that had been shot down, and delivered to Hezbollah, was a young and endangered Bonelli's eagle. Israeli ornithologist Yossi Leshem said he was tracking the bird for research and was "incredibly frustrated" it was killed. "Unfortunately, this bird made the stupid mistake of moving to Lebanon". "It's not enough that they kill people, now they are killing birds too".

A rare tagged eagle from the Golan Heights Gamla nature reserve that was captured by Syrian opposition forces and first suspected of carrying electronic espionage devices was then returned to Israel on 5 September 2017, as a gesture in recognition of the medical treatment Israel has provided to Syrians during the Syrian Civil War.

Griffon vultures 

The griffon vulture has nearly disappeared from the mountains of Israel and is the subject of a reintroduction project. As part of that project, vultures are tagged with radios and labels to keep track of the population.

Rumors spread among locals, repeated in some Saudi newspapers, that the bird was sent by Israel to spy on the country.

Prince Bandar bin Sultan, then Secretary General of the Saudi National Security Council, dismissed the rumors, said the equipment on the bird was simply there for scientific study, and that the bird would be quickly released. Saudi wildlife authorities agreed that the equipment was for solely scientific purposes. "Some Saudi journalists rushed in carrying the news of this bird for the sake of getting a scoop without checking the information… they should have asked the competent authorities about the bird before publishing such news," Bandar said at the time. Israeli officials described the rumor as "ludicrous" and said they were "stunned."

A spokesman for Israel's Park and Nature Authority told the Israeli daily Ma'ariv that Israeli scientists use GPS devices to track migration routes. "The device does nothing more than receive and store basic data about the bird's whereabouts," he said. The Israeli ornithologist Yossi Leshem of Tel Aviv University said that this was the third such detention of a bird tracked by Israeli scientists in three decades. He reported that Sudanese authorities detained an Egyptian vulture in the late 1970s, and a white pelican in the early 1980s, both carrying Israeli equipment used for animal migration tracking.

In January 2016, a griffon vulture with an Israeli tag was captured by residents of the Lebanese village of Bint Jbeil on suspicion of espionage after flying four kilometers (2.5 miles) across the border. The bird was tied by rope and, according to Lebanese security officials, checked for listening devices. The bird was later repatriated to Israel by UN peacekeepers.

Fish

Sharks 

In December 2010, several shark attacks occurred off the South Sinai resort of Sharm el-Sheikh in Egypt.

Following the attacks, in an interview on Tawfik Okasha's popular but controversial Egypt Today television show, a Captain Mustafa Ismail, introduced as "a famous diver," alleged that the GPS tracking device found on one of the sharks was in fact a "guiding device" planted by Israeli agents. Prompted in a television interview for comments, the governor of South Sinai, Mohammad Abdul Fadhil Shousha, initially said: "What is being said about the Mossad throwing the deadly shark [in the sea] to hit tourism in Egypt is not out of the question. But it needs time to confirm." The Israeli foreign ministry, in response, suggested that Shousha had seen "Jaws one time too many." The governor later dismissed any connection between the event and Israel.

Describing the conspiracy connection to Israel as "sad," Professor Mahmoud Hanafy, a marine biologist at Suez Canal University, pointed out that GPS devices are used by marine biologists to track sharks, not to remote-control them. Egyptian officials suggested that the attacks were due to overfishing, illegal feeding, the dumping overboard of sheep carcasses, or unusually high water temperatures.

Amr Yossef, adjunct professor of political science at the American University in Cairo, wrote that this and other similar conspiracy theories result from a misconception among the Egyptian public that Israel is all-powerful. Yossef wrote, "Notwithstanding that such allegations have no factual or logical grounds, no one stops to ask why should an Israel facing serious security challenges (Iran, Hamas, Hezbollah, etc.) busy itself with that kind of stuff."

Mammals 
Mammals have been used by the Israel Defense Forces since its inception in 1948. Pack animals such as mules and camels are used to negotiate rough terrain and haul equipment. The IDF conducts special operations training with llamas that are able to hide soldiers from heat-detection devices. Anti-tank dogs were used in Operation Blue and Brown, a 1988 attack on the headquarters of the Popular Front for the Liberation of Palestine – General Command in Lebanon. Antelope and oryxes have been introduced to Israeli army bases to clear vegetation while Barbary sheep are used to guard ammunition depots. Among the mammals that have been cited in Israel-related animal conspiracy theories are swine, hyenas, rodents, and a dolphin.

Dolphins 

The first accusation that Israel employs dolphins for espionage was made on 19 August 2015 when the Izz ad-Din al-Qassam Brigades of Hamas claimed they captured one wearing cameras and other equipment off the Gaza coast.

Iran's Fars News Agency called it instead an "Israeli-made robot dolphin equipped with espionage equipment, including video-recording cameras."

"Israel did not just stop at the bloody attacks against the Gaza Strip," the Arabic-language Palestinian daily al-Quds reported. "Now it has recruited a watery pet, the dolphin, known for his friendship with humans, to use for operations to kill Qassam Brigade Naval Commandos." The Israel Defense Forces did not respond to the accusation, but Foreign Policy magazine noted that while "dolphins have been used by various militaries, including by both the United States and Russia, this report likely falls into what is a surprisingly fertile genre of conspiracy theories: the notion that Israeli intelligence routinely uses all manner of birds and other animals as tools of espionage." Nonetheless, in January 2022, a masked spokesman for the al-Qassam Brigades claimed in a video message that Israeli security forces had recently used another dolphin to chase Hamas frogmen off the coast of the Gaza Strip.

Pigs 
On several occasions, Palestinian National Authority president Mahmoud Abbas accused Israel of releasing wild boars to destroy agricultural fields in the West Bank in order to cause damage to produce and intimidate Palestinian farmers. "Every night, they release wild pigs against us," Abbas was quoted as saying in one speech. An Israeli government official rejected the allegations, commenting that "It's a pity the Palestinian Authority president chooses to propagate such rubbish, and it raises questions about his real position on Israel." On 5 May 2016, a 10-year-old Palestinian girl was bitten on the hand either by a wild boar or a pig and suffered shock as a result. Palestinians blamed Israeli settlers for deliberately releasing boars in the West Bank to deliberately attack villagers as a way to keep them off their land, while others claimed that the Israeli West Bank barrier "affected the habitat of wild boars, possibly leading to higher concentrations of the animal's population in certain areas." "Using wild boars is part of an older Zionist imperative to colonize nature," claimed Palestinian researcher Rawan Samamreh.

Rats 
Allegations involving rats was on the news on 13 March 2018, when Jordanian TV host Dr. Bakr Al-Abadi told his viewers on Jordanian Prime TV:

"The Zionist entity gathered all the rats carrying the Bubonic plague in Norway, and released them in all the Egyptian provinces near the Sinai. According to several Egyptian sources, this operation took place in 1967, and these rats still exist in very large numbers. These rats breed very quickly and cause significant harm to crops. They devour these crops very quickly, and destroy grain silos. Even children are not safe from them. These rats often bite children's limbs. According to these sources, the Zionist entity, since the beginning of the normalization of its ties with Cairo, managed to smuggle chemical fertilizers and rotten seeds into Egypt, leading to the destruction of vast areas of soil and crops in Egypt. This is a well-planned strategic operation, with both short-term and long-term implications, but the clear goal is to annihilate the Arab world."

Cattle 
On December 27, 2022, Al-Hayat Al-Jadida, the official newspaper of the Palestinian National Authority, reported that Rushd Morrar, a village elder of Khirbet Yanun near Nablus, claimed that Israeli cattle are "recruited and trained" spies. "These are recruited and trained cattle, as on the neck of each cow they hang a medallion with an eavesdropping and recording device on it, and sometimes cameras, in order to monitor every detail in Khirbet Yanun large and small," he said, and repeated the assertion that "settlers release herds of wild boars" to destroy Palestinian crops.

Reptiles
In February 2018, Hassan Firouzabadi, a military advisor to Iranian supreme leader Ali Khamenei, accused Western countries, including Israel, of spying on Iranian nuclear sites using lizards and chameleons, which according to him attract "atomic waves." "We found out that their skin attracts atomic waves and that they were nuclear spies who wanted to find out where inside the Islamic Republic of Iran we have uranium mines and where we are engaged in atomic activities," he said.

Commentary on patterns 

Writing in The Times, James Hider linked the responses to the shark incident with those to the vulture incident and ascribed the reactions in Arab countries to "paranoia among Israel's enemies and its nominal friends," adding that "evidence of Mossad using animals is scant."

Jackson Diehl of The Washington Post also linked the two events, writing that Arab media and officials who circulate fantasies of Mossad sharks and spy birds "deserve to be mocked." While mentioning Bret Stephens' theory, that the conspiracy theories are an example of "the debasement of the Arab mind," Diehl wrote that the paranoia in fact has also a more benign explanation, since Israel's real covert operations "are almost as fantastic as the fantasies."

In 2011, Jihad el Khazen of the Lebanese newspaper Dar Al Hayat published a column analyzing recent animal-related conspiracy theories, explaining that the concept of conspiracy is not particular to Arabs. According to Dar Al Hayat, people "always look for explanations that suit their prejudices or whims, even as such explanations often give truth, logic and reason a slap in the face."

Gil Yaron wrote in The Toronto Star that "Many animals undoubtedly serve in Israel's army and security services: dogs sniff out bombs and alpaca help mountaineers carry their loads. [...] But tales about the use of sharks, birds, rodents or, as has also been claimed, insects in the service of the military are more the fruit of imagination than hard fact."

See also
 Animal-borne bomb attacks
 Animals used in espionage
 Conspiracy theories in the Arab world
 List of conspiracy theories
 Media coverage of the Arab–Israeli conflict

References

External links
Hunter lured Israeli vulture with "dead sheep"
Video: Israel's Latest Secret Weapon: The Death-Defying Rodent
Israeli 'Spy' Captured in Sudan

Conspiracy theories involving Israel
Military animals